Paul James (born 13 May 1982 in Neath, Wales) is a former Welsh international rugby union player. James' position of choice was as a prop.
In November 2009, James was called into the Wales team to play in the problem tight-head position against New Zealand at the Millennium Stadium on 7 November 2009.

In May 2012 he agreed a two-year contract with Bath Rugby

On 20 October 2014, it was announced James would return to Ospreys on a two-year deal at the end of the Aviva 
Premiership season. James coached junior side Baglan rfc.

References

External links

Wales profile

1982 births
Living people
Rugby union players from Neath
Ospreys (rugby union) players
Bath Rugby players
Welsh rugby union players
Wales international rugby union players
Rugby union props
Ospreys (rugby union)